Zürich Seebach is a railway station in the Seebach quarter of the Swiss city of Zürich. It is located on the Wettingen–Effretikon railway line (Furttal line).

Infrastructure 

The station is aligned on a west to east axis, and has two through platform tracks serving a single island platform, together with a number of non-platform through tracks and sidings. The platform is accessed at its eastern end by a subway, and at its western end by an access to the centre of the adjacent level crossing. The platform has no roof, but there is a shelter near the subway.

To the west the Furttal line continues as a dual track railway towards . To the east the line splits into two single track lines, one curving south to join the Oerlikon–Bülach line towards  (used by passenger trains) whilst the other joins the same line heading northbound. The latter line is only used by cargo trains. Zürich Seebach station sees significant through freight traffic, most of which takes the Furttal line in order to avoid passing through central Zürich, using the northern connector (via  and ) onto or off the Zürich–Winterthur line.

Trains between Oerlikon and Seebach use a narrow curve at slow speed.

The station building, an early work of architect Max Vogt (1925–2019), was built in 1959. It is no longer used.

Service 
Zürich Seebach station is served by S-Bahn trains only. The S6 service of the Zürich S-Bahn calls at the station, whereas the S21 peak hour service passes through. In the opposite direction, te S6 continues to Baden, taking 28 minutes for the journey. On weekends, there is also a nighttime S-Bahn service (SN6) offered by ZVV.

Summary of all S-Bahn services:

 Zürich S-Bahn:
 : half-hourly service to  via , and to  via .
 Nighttime S-Bahn (only during weekends):

The stations is not well connected to the Zürich tram network and bus routes. The closest tram/bus stop is Seebacherplatz, a ca. 3 minute walk from Seebach station. Better and more frequent connections exist at Zürich Oerlikon station.

Gallery

References

External links 

Seebacch
Railway stations in Switzerland opened in 1877